is a railway station on the Tōkaidō Main Line (JR Kōbe Line), Fukuchiyama Line (JR Takarazuka Line) and JR Tōzai Line of West Japan Railway Company (JR West), located in Amagasaki, Hyōgo, Japan, opened in 1874. Until 1997, Amagasaki was only a local stop, but it has since become a major junction with the opening of the JR Tōzai Line. Today, all commuter trains and limited express trains bound for the Fukuchiyama Line stop here.

Though Amagasaki is the official terminal of the Fukuchiyama Line and the JR Tōzai Line, all Fukuchiyama Line train services continue east to Osaka and beyond on the Tōkaidō Line or connect with the Gakkentoshi Line through the JR Tōzai Line. Tōzai Line trains continue west to Nishi-Akashi and beyond on the Tōkaidō Line, and Takarazuka and beyond on the Fukuchiyama Line.

The station is referred to as "JR Amagasaki" to distinguish between the station and Amagasaki Station operated by Hanshin Electric Railway. While these two stations are situated relatively close to each other, passengers transferring between these two stations must take buses to transfer between trains.

Lines
Tōkaidō Line (JR Kobe Line)
Fukuchiyama Line (JR Takarazuka Line)
JR Tōzai Line

Station layout
The station has four ground-level island platforms serving eight tracks.

This station is an intermediate station on the "JR Kōbe Line". However, the Tōkaidō Line only for Sannomiya is informed as the "JR Kōbe Line" and the line for Osaka and Kyoto as the "JR Kyōto Line", because the Tōkaidō Line between this station and Osaka is parts of the sections of the "JR Kōbe Line" and the "JR Takarazuka Line". The trains from the JR Takarazuka Line which terminate at Osaka and Shin-Osaka are informed as the "JR Takarazuka Line" for passing Tsukamoto Station.

Limited express trains
Kounotori (Shin-Osaka - ,)

Adjacent stations

History 
Station numbering was introduced in March 2018 with Amagasaki being assigned station number JR-A49 for the Kobe Line, JR-G49 for the Fukuchiyama Line, and JR-H49 for the Tozai Line.

See also
Amagasaki Station (Hanshin)
Amagasaki rail crash

References

External links

JR West - Amagasaki Station (Japanese)

Railway stations in Hyōgo Prefecture
JR Kobe Line
Tōkaidō Main Line
JR Tōzai Line
Railway stations in Japan opened in 1874